Edgard Lima de Melo (born June 10, 1980 in Santos) is a Brazilian football player who is currently playing for América (MG).

According to Ecuadorian newspapers,  Luís is a transfer target of Barcelona Sporting Club for the 2010 season.

External links
 CBF

1980 births
Living people
Brazilian footballers
Association football forwards
Al-Karamah players
América Futebol Clube (MG) players
Expatriate footballers in Syria
Syrian Premier League players
Sportspeople from Santos, São Paulo